Doto is a genus of sea slug, a nudibranch in the family Dotidae. This genus feeds on hydroids, as reflected by its serrated radula.

Oken's 1815 Lehrbuch der Naturgeschichte has been placed by ICZN Opinion 417 on the Official Index of Rejected and Invalid Works in Zoology, but an exception was made for Doto which has been placed by ICZN Opinion 697 on the Official List of Generic Names.

Species
Species within the genus Doto include:

 Doto acuta Schmekel & Kress, 1977
 Doto affinis (d'Orbigny, 1837)
 Doto africana Eliot, 1905
 Doto africoronata Shipman & Gosliner, 2015
 Doto albida Baba, 1955
 Doto alidrisi Ortea, Moro & Ocaña, 2010
 Doto amyra Er. Marcus, 1961 - hammerhead doto
 Doto annuligera Bergh, 1905
 Doto antarctica Eliot, 1907
 Doto apiculata Odhner, 1936
 Doto arteoi Ortea, 1978
 Doto awapa Ortea, 2001
 Doto bella Baba, 1938
 Doto caballa Ortea, Moro & Bacallado, 2010
 Doto cabecar Ortea, 2001
 Doto caramella Er. Marcus, 1957
 Doto carinova Moles, Avila & Wägele, 2016
 Doto casandra Ortea, 2013
 Doto cerasi Ortea & Moro, 1998
 Doto cervicenigra Ortea & Bouchet, 1989
 Doto chica Ev. Marcus and Er. Marcus, 1960
 Doto cindyneutes Bouchet, 1977
 Doto columbiana O'Donoghue, 1921 - British Columbia doto
 Doto confluens Hesse, 1872
 Doto coronata (Gmelin, 1791) - type species
 Doto crassicornis M. Sars, 1870
 Doto cristal Ortea, 2010
 Doto curere Ortea, 2001
 Doto cuspidata Alder & Hancock, 1862
 Doto divae Ev. Marcus and Er. Marcus, 1960
 Doto duao Ortea, 2001
 Doto dunnei Lemche, 1976
 Doto eireana Lemche, 1976
 Doto ensifer Mørch, 1859
 Doto eo Ortea & Moro, 2014
 Doto escatllari Ortea, Moro & Espinosa, 1998
 Doto floridicola  Simroth, 1888
 Doto fluctifraga Ortea & Perez, 1982
 Doto formosa A. E. Verrill, 1875
 Doto fragaria Ortea & Bouchet, 1989
 Doto fragilis (Forbes, 1838)
 Doto furva Garcia J.C. & Ortea, 1984
 Doto galapagoensis Ortea, 2010
 Doto greenamyeri Shipman & Gosliner, 2015
 Doto hydrallmaniae Morrow, Thorpe and Picton, 1992
 Doto hystrix Picton and Brown, 1981

 Doto indica Bergh, 1888
 Doto iugula Ortea, 2001
 Doto japonica Odhner, 1936
 Doto kekoldi Ortea, 2001
 Doto koenneckeri Lemche, 1976
 Doto kya Er. Marcus, 1961 - dark doto
 Doto lancei Ev. Marcus and Er. Marcus, 1967
 Doto lemchei Ortea and Urgorri, 1978
 Doto leopardina Vicente, 1967
 Doto maculata (Montagu, 1804)
 Doto millbayana Lemche, 1976
 Doto moravesa Ortea, 1997
 Doto nigromaculata Eliot, 1906
 Doto oblicua Ortea & Urgorri, 1978
 Doto obscura Eliot, 1906
 Doto onusta Hesse, 1872: (dubious) synonym of Doto floridicola Simroth, 1888
 Doto orcha Yonow, 2000
 Doto oscura Eliot, 1906
 Doto ostenta Burn, 1958
 Doto paulinae Trinchese, 1881
 Doto pinnatifida (Montagu, 1804)
 Doto pita Marcus, 1955
 Doto pontica Swennen, 1961
 Doto proranao Ortea, 2001
 Doto purpurea Baba, 1949
 Doto pygmaea (Bergh, 1871)
 Doto racemosa Risbec, 1928
 Doto rosacea Baba, 1949 
 Doto rosea Trinchese, 1881
 Doto sabuli Ortea, 2001
 Doto sarsiae Morrow, Thorpe and Picton, 1992
 Doto sotilloi (Ortea, Moro & Espinosa, 1998)
 Doto splendidissima Pola & Gosliner, 2015
 Doto torrelavega Ortea & Caballer, 2007
 Doto tuberculata Lemche, 1976
 Doto unguis Ortea & Rodriguez, 1989
 Doto ussi Ortea, 1982
 Doto uva Er. Marcus, 1955
 Doto varaderoensis Ortea, 2001
 Doto verdicioi Ortea & Urgorri, 1978
 Doto wildei Er. Marcus & Ev. Marcus, 1970
 Doto xangada Ortea, 2010
 Doto yongei Thompson, 1972

Species brought into synonymy
 Doto armoricana Hesse, 1872: synonym of Doto pinnatifida (Montagu, 1804)
 Doto aurea Trinchese, 1881: synonym of Doto rosea Trinchese, 1881
 Doto aurita Hesse, 1872: synonym of Doto fragilis (Forbes, 1838)
 Doto aurita Hesse, 1872: synonym of Doto rosea Trinchese, 1881
 Doto cinerea Trinchese, 1881: synonym of Doto rosea Trinchese, 1881
 Doto cornaliae Trinchese, 1881: synonym of Doto cuspidata Alder & Hancock, 1862
 Doto costae Trinchese, 1881: synonym of Doto coronata (Gmelin, 1791)
 Doto doerga Ev. Marcus and Er. Marcus, 1963: synonym of Doto pygmaea (Bergh, 1871)
 Doto forbesii Deshayes, 1853: synonym of Doto coronata (Gmelin, 1791)
 Doto ganda Er. Marcus, 1961: synonym of Doto amyra Er. Marcus, 1961
 Doto nigra Eliot, 1910: synonym of Doto pinnatifida (Montagu, 1804)
 Doto ocellifera Simroth, 1895: synonym of Costasiella ocellifera (Simroth, 1895)
 Doto pinnigera Hesse, 1872: synonym of Doto fragilis (Forbes, 1838)
 Doto splendida Trinchese, 1881: synonym of Doto coronata (Gmelin, 1791)
 Doto splendida Pola & Gosliner, 2015: synonym of Doto splendidissima Pola & Gosliner, 2015
 Doto styligera Hesse, 1872: synonym of Doto paulinae Trinchese, 1881
 Doto susanae Fez, 1962: synonym of Doto floridicola Simroth, 1888
 Doto umia Ev. Marcus & Er. Marcus, 1969: synonym of Doto chica Ev. Marcus & Er. Marcus, 1960
 Doto uncinata Hesse, 1872: synonym of Hancockia uncinata (Hesse, 1872)
 Doto varians MacFarland, 1966: synonym of Doto kya Er. Marcus, 1961
 Doto wara Er. Marcus, 1961: synonym of Doto amyra Er. Marcus, 1961

References

 Gray J.E. (1847). On the classification of the British Mollusca by W. E. Leach, M.D. Annals and Magazine of Natural History, (1)20: 267-273
 Powell A. W. B., New Zealand Mollusca, William Collins Publishers Ltd, Auckland, New Zealand 1979 
 http://www.catalogueoflife.org accessed 5 November 2009
 Vaught, K.C. (1989). A classification of the living Mollusca. American Malacologists: Melbourne, FL (USA). . XII, 195 pp.
 Gofas, S.; Le Renard, J.; Bouchet, P. (2001). Mollusca, in: Costello, M.J. et al. (Ed.) (2001). European register of marine species: a check-list of the marine species in Europe and a bibliography of guides to their identification. Collection Patrimoines Naturels, 50: pp. 180–213.

External links

Dotidae
Gastropod genera
Taxa named by Lorenz Oken